Per Mohn (born 3 December 1945) is a Norwegian politician for the Progress Party.

He served as a deputy representative to the Norwegian Parliament from Akershus during the term 1989–1993. In total he met during 12 days of parliamentary session.

References

1945 births
Living people
Deputy members of the Storting
Progress Party (Norway) politicians
Akershus politicians
Place of birth missing (living people)
20th-century Norwegian politicians